Khalil Khamis may refer to:

Khalil Khamis (footballer, born 1992), Emirati association football player
Khalil Khamis (footballer, born 1995), Lebanese association football player